Mountain Center is an unincorporated community and census-designated place in the  San Jacinto Mountains, within western central Riverside County, California.

Geography
It lies centered on the junction of State Route 74 and State Route 243 in the southern division of San Bernardino National Forest. Mountain Center lies just north of Lake Hemet, midway between Hemet and Palm Desert, just south of the town of Idyllwild, and it is southeast of the city of Riverside, the county seat of Riverside County. Although Mountain Center is unincorporated, it has a post office, with the ZIP code of 92561.

Lake Hemet is the only major body of water in Mountain Center.

The Mountain Fire and the Cranston Fire burn scars remain visible in the community.

Demographics
At the 2010 census Mountain Center had a population of 63. The racial makeup of Mountain Center was 60 (95%) White, 0 (0%) African American, 1 (1%) Native American, 1 (1%) Asian, 0 (0%) Pacific Islander, 0 (0%) from other races, and 1 (1%) from two or more races. Hispanic or Latino of any race were 15 people (24%).

The whole population lived in households, no one lived in non-institutionalized group quarters, and no one was institutionalized.

There were 36 households, 5 (14%) had children under the age of 18 living in them, 13 (36%) were opposite-sex married couples living together, 3 (8%) had a female householder with no husband present, 0 (0%) had a male householder with no wife present.  There were 0 (0%) unmarried opposite-sex partnerships, and 0 (0%) same-sex married couples or partnerships. 19 households (53%) were one person and 6 (17%) had someone living alone who was 65 or older. The average household size was 1.75.  There were 16 families (44% of households); the average family size was 2.56.

The age distribution was 12 people (19%) under the age of 18, 0 people (0%) aged 18 to 24, 8 people (13%) aged 25 to 44, 30 people (48%) aged 45 to 64, and 13 people (21%) who were 65 or older.  The median age was 53.5 years. For every 100 females, there were 75.0 males.  For every 100 females age 18 and over, there were 70.0 males.

There were 58 housing units at an average density of 30.8 per square mile, of the occupied units, 25 (69%) were owner-occupied and 11 (31%) were rented. The homeowner vacancy rate was 29%; the rental vacancy rate was 27%.  40 people (64% of the population) lived in owner-occupied housing units and 23 people (37%) lived in rental housing units.

Government
Federal:
In the United States Senate, California is represented by Democrats Dianne Feinstein and Alex Padilla.

State:

Local:
In the Riverside County Board of Supervisors, Mountain Center is in the Third District, represented by Chuck Washington.
In the jurisdiction of the Riverside County Sheriff's Department, with Sheriff Chad Bianco.
Fire service is provided by Riverside County Fire (CalFire)
Emergency medical service is provided by American Medical Response (AMR); however, the Idyllwild Fire Protection District is often the de facto emergency medical service under mutual aid due to its being in closer proximity than AMR.

Transportation
Forest Folk, using a grant from the Riverside County Transportation Commission, operates the Idyllwild Shuttle, which provides door-to-door service.

See also
 Idyllwild-Pine Cove, California
 Pinyon Pines, California

References

Census-designated places in Riverside County, California
San Jacinto Mountains
San Bernardino National Forest
Census-designated places in California